Linda Tanner is an American politician, who represents the Sullivan 9th District in the New Hampshire House of Representatives. A member of the Democratic Party, she represented the district from 2012 to 2014, before returning to office in 2016.

References

Living people
Democratic Party members of the New Hampshire House of Representatives
LGBT state legislators in New Hampshire
Women state legislators in New Hampshire
Lesbian politicians
21st-century American politicians
People from Sunapee, New Hampshire
Year of birth missing (living people)
21st-century American women politicians